Ramanujapuram is a village in the Papanasam taluk of Thanjavur district, Tamil Nadu, India.

Demographics 
As per the 2001 census, Ramanujapuram had a total population of 2217 with 1115 males and 1102 females. The sex ratio was 988. The literacy rate was 56.55.

References 

Villages in Thanjavur district